= Sowt Alasema FM =

Sowt Alasema FM اذاعة صوت العاصمة
- Iraq

Programming
- Language: Arabic (mainly)
- Format: Talk; News; Sport

Ownership
- Owner: Amanat Baghdad

Sowt Alasema FM (Arabic: اذاعة صوت العاصمة; ) is an Iraqi public radio station but mainly an Arabic-speaking station, broadcasting in many locations throughout the Middle East on AM and FM from Baghdad. It was founded in 2008.

== History ==
Radio Sowt Alasema started broadcasting in 2008, and was created by Amanat Baghdad.
